Ken McMullen may refer to:

Ken McMullen (baseball) (born 1942), former third baseman in Major League Baseball
Ken McMullen (film director) (born 1948), film director and artist